Koorkenchery is a southern suburb of Thrissur in Kerala state, India. It is a major residential and commercial area in Thrissur. The Sri Maheswara Temple is located in the area, famous for its Pooyam festival. It is celebrated at the temple on Pooyam day, of the Malayalam month of Makaram (January or February). Koorkenchery is surrounded by desams (areas) like Kannankulangara, Chiyyaram, Vadookara and Kanimangalam.

Religious places
 Sri Maheswara Temple
 Sree Mahavishnu Temple, Kannankulangara
 Olakkada Sree Bhadrakali Temple
nirmalapuram St Joseph's Church 
 St. Sebastians Chapel
 Christ the King Church
 Thoppil Sammooham Kshetram, Vadookara
 Achanthevar Siva Temple
 Keezhthrikkovil Temple
 Koorkancherry Juma Masjid
 Vadookara Juma Masjid

Educational institutions
 SN Boys & Girls High School
 JPHS & Teacher's Training Centre
 Boothanandha LP School
 Ramananda School
 Little Miracle Montessori Preschool
 SN College, Koorkenchery

Hospitals
Elite Mission Hospital, Koorkenchery
Metropolitan Hospital, Koorkenchery

See also
 Thrissur
 Thrissur District

References

Suburbs of Thrissur city